MS Sama was a Norwegian motor merchant ship, she was torpedoed and sunk by a German submarine during World War II.

The 1,799-ton (grt, 2200 tdwt) Sama was launched at Lindholmens in Gothenburg on December 19, 1936 and completed in April 1937. She was built for the Oslo-based Norwegian shipping company Chr. Gundersen & Co.

In 1941, Sama played a significant role in the rescuing of survivors from the badly damaged British troopship . Sama rescued 234 survivors and arrived at Stornoway of the Hebrides Islands on March 29, 1941.

On February 15, 1942 she sailed as part of the trade convoy ON 67 from Belfast on a westbound course for St. John's. She was carrying 1,040 tons of china clay when the convoy was attacked by German submarines in the Atlantic Ocean just after midnight on February 22. At 2:25 AM, Sama was hit in the stern by a torpedo from the German submarine  under the command of Kapitänleutnant Adolf Piening. The ship sank within a few minutes of the attack.

Of her crew and passengers, 19 perished and 20 were saved by the American destroyer . The maritime inquiry after the incident was held in Halifax, Nova Scotia on March 7, 1942. A Norwegian copy of the inquiry brief currently exists.

References

1936 ships
Ships built in Gothenburg
Ships of Nortraship
Maritime incidents in February 1942
Ships sunk by German submarines in World War II
World War II shipwrecks in the Atlantic Ocean